T. R. Venkataraman, an Indian politician, formerly served as a Member of the Legislative Assembly. The Tenkasi constituency elected him to the Tamil Nadu legislative assembly as an Indian National Congress candidate in the 1984 election.

References 

Indian National Congress politicians from Tamil Nadu
Living people
Year of birth missing (living people)
Tamil Nadu MLAs 1985–1989